The 704th Military Intelligence Brigade, a subordinate unit of the U.S. Army Intelligence and Security Command, conducts synchronized full-spectrum signals intelligence, computer network, and information assurance operations directly and through the National Security Agency to satisfy national, joint, combined and Army information requirements.

 Headquarters and Headquarters Company
  741st Military Intelligence Battalion
  742nd Military Intelligence Battalion
  743rd Military Intelligence Battalion
 United States Army Technical Support Squadron (USATSS)

741st MI Battalion 
This Battalion is stationed at Fort George G. Meade, Maryland.

The 741st MI Battalion provides soldiers to conduct information superiority operations within the National Security Agency and Central Security Service; linguist support to the National Security Agency, the intelligence community and other U.S. government agencies; and operates the Joint Training Center on behalf of the INSCOM, Air Intelligence Agency and Naval Network Warfare Command.

742nd MI Battalion  
Also at Fort George G. Meade, the 742nd conducts contributory analysis and reporting through the Army Technical Control and Analysis Element, carries out information operations and supports satellite communications systems.

743rd MI Battalion 
Located at Buckley Space Force Base, Colorado, the 743rd provides technically qualified “space smart” soldiers for exercises and in support of tactical commanders.

References

External links and Sources
 Brigade Website
 Brigade Lineage
 US Army Intelligence and Security Command

704
Military units and formations established in 1988